Stachys arvensis is a species of flowering plant in the mint family known by the common names field woundwort and staggerweed. It is native to Europe, Western Asia, and North Africa. It is known on other continents as an introduced species and widespread weed.

It grows in many types of habitat, including disturbed areas, and often in moist spots. The stem is squared in cross-section and it is covered in rough hairs.

The inflorescence is made up of interrupted clusters of flowers borne in the axils of the leaf pairs. Each cluster has up to 6 flowers with pinkish corollas in hairy purple-tinged calyces of sepals.

Uses
As its common name 'field woundwort' suggests, this herb has been used since Roman times in healing wounds, and its seeds, scattered by Roman soldiers, mark the lines of Roman roads. Its close relatives hedge woundwort and marsh woundwort are also used to treat wounds.

References

External links
Jepson Manual Treatment

PIER Profile
Washington Burke Museum
Photo gallery

arvensis
Flora of Western Asia
Flora of North Africa
Flora of Europe
Taxa named by Carl Linnaeus